Ingvar Moe (11 December 1936 – 2 September 1993) was a Norwegian poet, novelist and children's writer. He published more than 20 books including short stories, novels, poetry and textbooks.

Biography
Ingvar Moe was born and grew up in the farming district of Etne in Sunnhordland in the county of Hordaland. His parents were baker Sigurd Moe and Brita Talette Amanda Hardeland. He graduated from the teachers' college at Stord in 1959. He worked for two decades as a teacher, principally in Nøtterøy and Nodeland.

He made his literary début in 1975 with the poetry collection Løktastolpefrø, for which he was awarded the Tarjei Vesaas' debutantpris. In 1976 he published the story collection Sommaren te Ingjeberr. Among his novels are Rundt sjøen from 1986, Forbanninga from 1988, and Kvinner mellom mørke fjell from 1990.

He worked in many genres and turn to different audiences. He wrote, in addition to poetry, short stories and novels, textbooks for primary school texts for cabaret and theater. In addition to his writing for adults, he wrote the youth novels and children's books. Moe also released an  autobiographical novel,  Rundt sjøen (1986). As an author of books for children, he is known for humorous books about the grandmother.

Awards
 1975 Tarjei Vesaas' debutantpris
 1987 Melsom-prisen
 1992 Kultur- og kirkedepartementets oversetterpris for barne- og ungdomslitteratur

Selected works

Books of Poetry
 løktastolpefrø, 1975
 Fløttjevels bok, 1977
 Himabrent, 1979
 Barre litt, altså. Rime-lige dikt og songar, 1989
 Dikt i samling, 1995
 Ord om ord. Etterlatne dikt, 1996

Novels
 Rundt sjøen. Bilete frå ein barndomsstad, 1986
 Forbanninga, 1988
 Kvinner mellom mørke fjell, 1990
 Minnenes melodi. Ei bygdehore fortel, 1991
 Ulveslåtten, 1992

Children’s books
 Dei må ikkje skyta Garm, 1979
 Garm blir borte, 1981
 Heia oldemor! Ei heilt vill forteljing, 1984
 Oldemor rock! Ei nokså vill forteljing, 1985
 Oldemor og skurken, Ei endå villare forteljing, 1989
 Oldemor gifter seg. Ei heilt vill bryllaupsbok, 1993

References

1936 births
1993 deaths
People from Etne
Nynorsk-language writers
20th-century Norwegian poets
Norwegian male poets
Norwegian children's writers
20th-century Norwegian novelists
Norwegian male novelists
20th-century Norwegian male writers